The 1988–89 Luxembourg National Division was the 75th season of top level association football in Luxembourg.

Overview
10 teams competed, and CA Spora Luxembourg won the championship.

First phase

Table

Results

Second phase

Championship stage

Table

Results

Relegation/Promotion stage

Group A

Table

Results

Group B

Table

Results

References
Luxembourg - List of final tables (RSSSF)

Luxembourg National Division seasons
Lux
1988–89 in Luxembourgian football